Booyah was a social web and mobile entertainment company. The development team drew its experience from the consumer web and social gaming space and entertainment studios such as Blizzard Entertainment, Activision, EA, and Insomniac Games.  Booyah was financed by Accel Partners and Kleiner Perkins Caufield & Byers iFund.

Booyah used to have five games, all of which were apps, in production: MyTown 2, the sequel to MyTown with similar gameplay, MyTown Animals, a location-based game in which animals live, No Zombies Allowed, a town building game in which Zombies attack which have to be defeated, Early Bird, and its sequel, Early Bird and Friends. Booyah also had two other games that were not in production: MyTown, a location-based game available on the iPhone and iPod Touch with over 3.1 million users, and Nightclub City, a music-themed Facebook app, with over 7.9 million monthly active users. Booyah also announced InCrowd, an app designed to utilize Facebook Places.

In March 2014, Booyah went out of business and shut down its website. All game servers were shut down as a result of this; all the games Booyah created are now gone and no more will come out.

References

Mobile content